Senator Rafferty may refer to:

John Chandler Rafferty (1816–1880), New York State Senate
John Rafferty Jr. (born 1953), Pennsylvania State Senate